The Taiwan Travel Act is an Act of the United States Congress. Passed on February 28, 2018, it was signed into law by President Donald Trump on March 16, 2018. As a follow-up to the Taiwan Relations Act, the bill allows high-level officials of the United States to visit Taiwan and vice versa.

The law is considered a substantial upgrade to Taiwan–United States relations, making them official though still sub-diplomatic.  As such, the law was harshly criticized by the government of the People's Republic of China in Beijing (which had formally protested the bill through ambassador Cui Tiankai, demanding it not pass) for violating the One-China principle, which holds Taiwan is an inalienable sovereign part of China.

In July 2019, Taiwanese President Tsai Ing-wen used this act to travel freely to New York City, New York and Denver, Colorado while in transit to countries in the Caribbean that still have official diplomatic relations with Taiwan. Before the act was passed, Taiwanese presidents usually could only meet local Texas government officials in Houston, Texas, where they could stopover on transit flights to the Caribbean and South America. Tsai was the first Taiwanese president to visit UN ambassadors of Taiwan's diplomatic allies in New York since the passage of the Taiwan Relations Act in 1979. In New York, she also met with a U.S. congressional delegation headed by U.S. House Foreign Affairs Chairman Eliot Engel (D-NY) and Ranking Member Michael McCaul (R-TX). In Denver, she met with the governor of Colorado, some U.S. congress members and mayors from the local area and visited the National Center for Atmospheric Research and the National Renewable Energy Laboratory.

On August 2, 2022, speaker of the House Nancy Pelosi visited Taiwan, being the highest-ranking U.S. government official to visit it in 25 years. Pelosi said her visit was a sign of the U.S. Congress's commitment to Taiwan. FAPA President Minze Chien said, "With Speaker Pelosi’s trip, it is very gratifying for us Taiwanese Americans to see this further implementation of the 2018 Taiwan Travel Act and a further loosening of restrictions on U.S. high-level visits to and from Taiwan. FAPA is very proud of the coming to fruition of this Act. Next, it behooves the U.S. Congress to invite Taiwan President Tsai Ing-wen to Washington, DC, to share with members of Congress and with the American public her views on the best ever U.S.-Taiwan relations in history that we witness today." This Congressional Delegation trip (CODEL) embodies the type of high level exchange that the Taiwan Travel Act adopted in 2018 and supported in ALEC model policy was meant to facilitate.

Background

When the U.S. established diplomatic relations with the People's Republic of China in 1979, it also ceased to officially recognize Taiwan but continued to maintain unofficial relations with the island. In the same year, the U.S. enacted the Taiwan Relations Act.

In 2016, the Taiwan Travel Act was introduced to the U.S. Congress by Representative Steve Chabot and Senator Marco Rubio; part of the House Foreign Relations Committee and the Senate Foreign Relations Committee, respectively.  The bill was considered a follow-up to the Taiwan Relations Act and stated that the U.S. and Taiwan had suffered from insufficient high-level communication since 1979, when the U.S. started to restrict its officials' visits to Taiwan.

Chinese pressure on Congress 
In August 2017, Cui Tiankai, the Chinese Ambassador to the United States, sent a letter expressing "grave concern" to leaders of the House and Senate, demanding they block provisions related to Taiwan in the National Defense Authorization Act of that year, which included the Taiwan Travel Act as well as the Taiwan Security Act of 2017.  In the letter, Ambassador Cui stated the legislation together with another bill represent “provocations against China's sovereignty, national unity and security interests,” and “have crossed the ‘red line’ on the stability of the China-U.S. relationship”. US lawmakers perceived this wording, together with the Chinese threat of “severe consequences” as inappropriate interference and "out of line".

American responses 

One Democratic aide said: “Making these sorts of threats and laying down ‘red lines’ on domestic legislative action is neither helpful or constructive to build the sort of relationship needed between the United States and China.” The Washington Post journalist Josh Rogin noted:Other congressional aides said that no other embassy uses threats as a tactic to influence Congress, especially not via an official communication. Most embassies try to build relationships and persuade U.S. policymakers to support what they believe is in their national interest. But not China.Ranking House Foreign Affairs Committee Democrat Eliot Engel (D-NY) said in response:“China carries out this kind of heavy-handed behavior with other countries around the world.  It's interesting to me that they now feel that they can get away with these kind of threats and vague pressure tactics with the U.S. Congress.”It has been suggested that China's heavy-handed tactics and direct threats to United States Congress through official communications backfired, by forcing Congress to make a show of force against perceived Chinese bullying.  This affected the unanimous passage of the law.

Congressional delegation to Taiwan in September 2018 
In September 2018, House Foreign Affairs Committee Chairman Ed Royce led a bipartisan delegation of US lawmakers to Taiwan, where he was awarded the Republic of China (Taiwan)'s Order of Brilliant Star with Special Grand Cordon from President Tsai Ing-wen for his "outstanding contributions to Taiwan's development".  Royce had previously been awarded the Order of Brilliant Star with Grand Cordon in 2015.

Upon receiving his accolade from President Tsai on September 1, Royce said:“I am honored to receive the Order of Brilliant Star with Special Grand Cordon and view it as a symbol of the special bonds between the U.S. and Taiwan. I want to thank President Tsai for receiving me today, and for her commitment to making the partnership between our two peoples even stronger – a commitment I share. Taiwan is one of our most important friends in the Asia Pacific region, and our partnership is anchored in a shared commitment to democratic values.“As a free and democratic society, Taiwan is an example to its neighbors in the Asia Pacific. Its economy is diverse and growing, which means there is great potential for increased economic ties. The United States will remain steadfast in its commitments to Taiwan's security. The Taiwan Relations Act and the Six Assurances make it clear that a stable, free, and prosperous Taiwan is in America's national security interests.”

Legislative history
On , the U.S. House Committee on Foreign Affairs passed the bill with no opposition. Committee Chairman Ed Royce explained:Currently, the State Department enforces self-imposed restrictions on official travel between the U.S. and Taiwan. This bill denounces that practice by encouraging more frequent official visits – including at the highest levels – and will serve to further strengthen the critical U.S.-Taiwan partnership. Shortly afterwards, it was also passed unanimously by the Senate on February 28. President Donald Trump signed the Act into law on March 16, 2018.

Provisions
Provisions of the Taiwan Travel Act state that the U.S. should:
Allow officials at all levels of the U.S. government to travel to Taiwan to meet their Taiwanese counterparts;
Allow high-level Taiwanese officials to enter the United States under respectful conditions and to meet with U.S. officials;
Encourage the Taipei Economic and Cultural Representative Office and any other instrumentality established by Taiwan to conduct business in the United States.

Reaction

Taiwan
In January 2018, Taiwanese President Tsai Ing-wen expressed her gratitude to the U.S. Congress for "supporting Taiwan's democracy" through her Twitter account, stating she believed the Taiwan Travel Act would "strengthen and enhance the long-standing partnership between the two sides."  Taiwan's Ministry of Foreign Affairs also showed its support for the bill, saying Taiwan was "committed to fostering an upgraded strategic partnership with the U.S."

People's Republic of China
The Chinese state-controlled Xinhua News Agency indicated that China was "strongly dissatisfied" with the bill and said it violated the one-China policy that asserts Taiwan is a province of China.

See also
Taiwan Relations Act
TAIPEI Act
Six Assurances
Political status of Taiwan

Taiwan–United States relations
China–United States relations
Cross-Strait relations
Two Chinas

References

External links 
 Taiwan Travel Act (PDF/details) as amended in the GPO Statute Compilations collection
 Taiwan Travel Act (PDF/details) as enacted in the US Statutes at Large

Acts of the 115th United States Congress
United States foreign relations legislation
Taiwan–United States relations
China–United States relations
2018 in international relations